Amy Fine Collins is an American journalist, muse, and author who has been a special correspondent for Vanity Fair since 1993, covering culture, style, and fashion. Starting in 2019 Amy began collaborating as an editor-at-large of Airmail magazine with Graydon Carter.

Early life and education 
Amy was born in Fairfield, Connecticut, as the daughter of Dr. Harold J. Fine. She grew up between Bucks County, Pennsylvania and Knoxville, Tennessee with regular trips to family in New York.

She graduated from Swarthmore College and Columbia University with three degrees in Art History.

Career 
Amy taught at Columbia University for two years and at Parsons The New School for Design for one. Thereafter she became a Style Editor under Nancy Novogrod at House & Garden and Style Editor at Harper’s Bazaar under Liz Tilberis. In 1990 Amy started working at Vanity Fair, under Graydon Carter, as contributing editor.  In 1993 she became Special Correspondent for the magazine. In 2003 she became one of the partners of the International Best Dressed List.

Honors
In 1994 Amy was inducted into the International Best Dressed List, and in 1997 into its International Best Dressed Hall of Fame List.

She was awarded the Front Page Award by the Newswomen's Club of New York for her cultural criticism piece 'Toujours Couture' written for Vanity Fair. In 2011 she won the award again, for in-depth reporting, for her article 'Sex Trafficking in America: The Girls Next Door' written for Vanity Fair.

Books
American Impressionism, published in 1990 by Smithmark Publishers 
Hair Style, published in 1995 
The God of Driving, published in 2004

References

External links

 

American women journalists
Swarthmore College alumni
Columbia University alumni
American magazine editors
Women magazine editors
Year of birth missing (living people)
Living people
21st-century American women